Milos Raonic was the two-time defending champion and won the title for the third year in a row, defeating Tommy Haas in the final 6–4, 6–3.

Seeds

Draw

Finals

Top half

Bottom half

Qualifying

Seeds

Qualifiers

Draw

First qualifier

Second qualifier

Third qualifier

Fourth qualifier

External links
 Main draw
 Qualifying draw

SAP Open - Singles
2013 Singles
2013 SAP Open